The Ring magazine was established in 1922 and has named a notable boxing Event of the Year since 1993, based on the magazine's writers' criteria.

Event of the Year by decade

1990s 
 1993Fan Man at Bowe-Holyfield II
 1994Revenge: The Rematches
 1995Tyson returns
 1996Riot at the Garden (see Riddick Bowe vs. Andrew Golota)
 1997The Bite
 1998Tyson's reinstatement
 1999The IBF indictments

2000s 
 2000Oscar De La Hoya vs. Shane Mosley
 2001Middleweight World Championship Series
 2002The Lewis–Tyson press conference brawl
 2003Roy Jones fights at heavyweight
 2004Lennox Lewis retirement
 2005The Contender
 2006Corrales-Castillo III weigh-in
 2007Oscar De La Hoya vs. Floyd Mayweather Jr.
 2008The retirement of Floyd Mayweather Jr.
 2009Antonio Margarito caught cheating

2010s 
 2010The failure to make Mayweather vs. Pacquiao
 2011Manny Pacquiao vs. Juan Manuel Marquez III
 2012September 15: HBO and Showtime both hold boxing events in Las Vegas: Chávez Jr. vs. Martínez and Álvarez vs. López
 2013Floyd Mayweather Jr. vs. Canelo Álvarez
 2014Carl Froch vs. George Groves II
 2015Floyd Mayweather Jr. vs. Manny Pacquiao
 2016 The death of Muhammad Ali
 2017 Canelo Álvarez vs. Gennady Golovkin
 2018 HBO leaves boxing (see HBO World Championship Boxing and Boxing After Dark)
 2019 Andy Ruiz Jr. vs. Anthony Joshua II

2020s 
 2020 COVID-19
 2021 Anthony Joshua vs. Oleksandr Usyk
 2022 Katie Taylor vs. Amanda Serrano

References

External links
 

Boxing awards
Recurring events established in 1993
Event of the year